Enver Hoxhaj (born 4 October 1969) is a Kosovar politician. He served as Minister for Foreign Affairs of the Republic of Kosovo and a Former Leader of the Democratic Party of Kosovo.

Career
Hoxhaj served as a professor at the University of Pristina. He worked at WUS Austria and founded Kosovar Research and Documentation Institute. In March 2004 he joined the Democratic Party of Kosovo. He was Minister of Education, Science and Technology of the Republic of Kosovo. He served twice as a Foreign Minister, once from 2011 to 2014, under the mandate of the government led by Hashim Thaci, and the second time he was named as a Foreign Minister started in June 2016, under Prime Minister Isa Mustafa.

See also
List of foreign ministers in 2017
List of current foreign ministers

Notes

References

External links

 Ministry site 

|-

1969 births
Democratic Party of Kosovo politicians
Deputy Prime Ministers of Kosovo
Foreign ministers of Kosovo
Ministers of Education, Science and Technology (Kosovo)
Government ministers of Kosovo
Academic staff of the University of Pristina
Kosovan diplomats
Living people
People from Suva Reka